"The Sound of Breaking Up" is a song recorded by Australian singer-songwriter and music producer Paul Mac and features the vocals of Peta Morris. The song was released in October 2001 as the third single from Mac's debut studio album 3000 Feet High. "The Sound of Breaking Up" peaked at number 25 on the Australian ARIA Charts.
 
At the APRA Music Awards of 2002 the song was nominated for the APRA Award for Most Performed Dance Work.

Track listing
 "The Sound of Breaking Up" – 3:20
 "The Sound of Breaking Up" (Paul Mac’s Afterdark remix) – 3:34
 "The Sound of Breaking Up" (L'More remix) – 7:34
 "Just the Thing" (Sgt Slick's Vinylvoyage Club mix) – 9:32

Charts

Release history

References

2001 singles
2001 songs